Brian Davis is a former  television play-by-play announcer, most recently of the Oklahoma City Thunder, an NBA franchise based in Oklahoma City, Oklahoma.

Sportscasting biography
In 2004, he was host of Seattle SuperSonics telecasts, called occasional Sonics games, and also worked for NBA Radio as a sideline reporter and studio host. Davis also was a member of the Chicago Bulls broadcasts as a television studio host and has called play-by-play for college football and basketball for the Big Ten Conference, Pacific-10 Conference, Conference USA, and the Mid-American Conference.
On the professional side other than NBA basketball, Davis was the radio voice of the Seattle Seahawks, college football for CBS Radio/Westwood One, the Chicago Blackhawks, Chicago Fire S.C., and preseason games for the Arizona Cardinals. He was a sports anchor for CBS Radio and all Chicago-news affiliates. Davis has covered the Olympics, Stanley Cup Finals, the NBA Finals, DePaul Blue Demons men's basketball, and hosted radio broadcasts for the Chicago Blackhawks and Bears.

Personal
Davis graduated from Northwestern University with a degree in journalism. He resides in Oklahoma City with his spouse, Judy. Brian has won numerous awards in his career.

Controversies
During a basketball game on April 11, 2018, Davis described Thunder point guard Russell Westbrook as playing "out of his cotton-picking mind" after an assist against the Memphis Grizzlies. Due to offensive racial connotations of this phrase, Davis apologized for the remark. The Thunder announced that Davis would be suspended for game one of the Thunder's first-round Western Conference playoff series against the Utah Jazz. After the season the Thunder declined to renew the contract of the only television play-by-play announcer the team has had since it relocated in 2008. A team statement did not give a reason for the decision.

References

Living people
Sportspeople from Chicago
Television anchors from Chicago
American television sports announcers
American radio sports announcers
Seattle SuperSonics announcers
Seattle Seahawks announcers
Arizona Cardinals announcers
Chicago Blackhawks announcers
Chicago Bears announcers
Oklahoma City Thunder announcers
National Basketball Association broadcasters
College basketball announcers in the United States
National Hockey League broadcasters
College football announcers
National Football League announcers
American soccer commentators
Medill School of Journalism alumni
Year of birth missing (living people)